John Joseph Brownschidle, Jr. (born October 2, 1955) is an American former professional ice hockey player who played 494 NHL games with the St. Louis Blues and Hartford Whalers between 1977 and 1985. He was born in Buffalo, New York. Brownschidle was also a member of the University of Notre Dame hockey team before turning professional. His brother Jeff Brownschidle was also a former National Hockey League player who played three games for the Hartford Whalers. Internationally Brownshidle played for the American national team at the 1975 and 1979 World Championships.

Career statistics

Regular season and playoffs

International

Awards and honors

Miscellaneous: Set St. Louis single-season records (since broken) for assists (32) and points (44) by a defenseman in 1979-80. ... Set St. Louis single-season record (since broken) for assists by a defenseman (33 in 1981-82). ... Missed end of 1982 playoffs with bruised kidney. ... Missed parts of 1982-83 season with mild concussion and bruised kidney. ... Left unprotected by Hartford in 1986 NHL Waiver Draft and claimed by Buffalo in October 1986, but never played for parent team.

References

External links

Brownschidle's bio at Hockeydraftcentral.com

1955 births
Living people
AHCA Division I men's ice hockey All-Americans
American men's ice hockey defensemen
Binghamton Whalers players
Cleveland Crusaders draft picks
Hartford Whalers players
Ice hockey people from Buffalo, New York
Notre Dame Fighting Irish men's ice hockey players
Rochester Americans players
Salt Lake Golden Eagles (CHL) players
St. Louis Blues draft picks
St. Louis Blues players